Gary J. Rose (born ) is an English professional rugby league footballer who played in the 1980s and 1990s.

Background
Gary Rose was born in Leeds, West Riding of Yorkshire, England.

Playing career
Gary Rose made his début for Featherstone Rovers on Sunday 31 December 1989, and he played his last match for Featherstone Rovers during the 1992–93 season.

References

1965 births
Living people
Dewsbury Rams players
English rugby league players
Featherstone Rovers players
Hull F.C. players
Keighley Cougars players
Leeds Rhinos players
Rugby league players from Leeds
Rugby league props
Rugby league second-rows